Harry Potter and the Chamber of Secrets is an action-adventure video game. It is based on the 2002 film of the same name.

The game received positive reviews from critics across all releases of the game.

Gameplay
The game's core gameplay is straightforward. Taking control of Harry, the player explores Hogwarts castle and grounds. Throughout the course of the game, the player will encounter events that tie into the storyline of the second book. Filling the gaps between these events are various classes, where the player will learn how to fly a broomstick and learn new spells for combating bosses, among other things. Each new spell is accompanied by a challenge, which the player must get through in a certain amount of time to complete that class period. During the later parts of the game, the player will face challenges which are not time-limited and are not related to learning spells. These challenges are all based on events from the book, for example, travelling into the Forbidden Forest and gathering ingredients for a potion Hermione is making.

Versions

PlayStation
The PlayStation version of the game is a sequel to the Harry Potter and the Philosopher's Stone game and was also developed by Argonaut Games. It retains many elements and graphics from its predecessor but with some places in Hogwarts being expanded or moved as well as new mini-games that are played as the storyline progresses. Unlike other versions, most of the new spells learned from attending classes are upgrades from the previous game.

PlayStation 2, Xbox and GameCube
There are also slight differences between the three other console versions of the game. The GameCube, PlayStation 2 and Xbox versions of the game allow the player to access a broom and enter free-flight mode. While the PlayStation 2 version allows the player to land anywhere they want, in the Xbox and GameCube version the landing zones are limited. In the GameCube version, there is an exclusive feature involving GC–GBA connectivity that allows a secret room to be opened in the GC version when connected with the GBA version of the game.

PC/MAC
The PC/Mac version of the game, which was created by a different developer than the console versions, features completely different levels and gameplay from the console cousins. The game features the same graphics and character design as the Philosopher's Stone (PC). It also retains some of the spells learned in the previous game and involves the player learning new spells by attending more classes at Hogwarts.

Game Boy Color
The Game Boy Color version is a typical role-playing game. However, Harry Potter, Ron Weasley, Hermione Granger and Gilderoy Lockhart are all playable characters at various points in the game.

Game Boy Advance
The Game Boy Advance version has the fewest spells. It is based on the PS2/Xbox/GC and Mac versions. It is mostly made up of mini-quests (unlike other versions).

Reception

The game received generally favorable reviews, according to review aggregator Metacritic. Entertainment Weekly gave it a B+.

The Xbox version received a platinum family hits edition for selling over 100,000 copies. The musical score for the game, created by Jeremy Soule, was awarded a BAFTA Games Award for Best Score, Game Music Category.

In the United States, The Chamber of Secrets Game Boy Advance version sold 970,000 copies and earned $25 million by August 2006. During the period between January 2000 and August 2006, it was the 18th highest-selling game launched for the Game Boy Advance, Nintendo DS or PlayStation Portable in that country.

By July 2006, the PlayStation 2 version of Chamber of Secrets had sold 700,000 copies and earned $28 million in the United States. Next Generation ranked it as the 89th highest-selling game launched for the PlayStation 2, Xbox or GameCube between January 2000 and July 2006 in that country. Combined console sales of the Harry Potter line reached 3 million units in the United States by July 2006. The PlayStation 2 version also received a "Platinum" sales award from the Entertainment and Leisure Software Publishers Association (ELSPA), indicating sales of at least 300,000 copies in the United Kingdom. The game sold 9 million copies by 2003 and generated $500 million in revenue.

References

External links
 
 
 
 
 

2002 video games
Action-adventure games
Argonaut Games games
Electronic Arts games
Eurocom games
Flying cars in fiction
Game Boy Advance games
Game Boy Color games
GameCube games
Games with GameCube-GBA connectivity
Griptonite Games
Harry Potter 2
PlayStation (console) games
PlayStation 2 games
Single-player video games
Unreal Engine games
Video game sequels
Video games with isometric graphics
Video games developed in the United Kingdom
Warner Bros. video games
Windows games
Video games based on adaptations
Video games based on films
Video games scored by Jeremy Soule
Video games set in England
Video games set in London
Video games set in Scotland
Video games set in the 1990s
Video games set in 1992
Video games set in 1993
Video games set in castles
Video games with alternative versions
Xbox games
BAFTA winners (video games)
Aspyr games
Video games developed in the United States
Westlake Interactive games
Amaze Entertainment games